He Luting (traditional: 賀綠汀; simplified: 贺绿汀; pinyin: Hè Lùtīng; July 20, 1903 – April 27, 1999) was a Chinese composer of the early 20th century. He composed songs for Chinese films beginning in the 1930s, some of which remain popular.

During the 1930s, He studied at the Shanghai Conservatory of Music under Huang Tzu and Russian composer Alexander Tcherepnin. Tcherepnin named him winner of a piano composition contest in 1934 for his work Buffalo Boy's Flute (Mu Tong Duan Di,《牧童短笛》), which made him famous nationwide. His best-known compositions are "Song of the Four Seasons" (Si Ji Ge,《四季歌》) and "The Wandering Songstress" (Tianya Ge Nü,《天涯歌女》), with lyrics by Tian Han), both composed for the 1937 film Street Angel and sung by Zhou Xuan.

He Luting had a complicated relationship with the Chinese Communist Party. He became a member after moving to Shanghai, and during the Second Sino-Japanese War he wrote several songs for the "mass song movement", most famously the "Guerrillas' Song". After the Communist victory in the Civil War, he was appointed director of the Shanghai Conservatory of Music. But during the Cultural Revolution, He Luting became a target due to his associate with Western music and particularly his defense of Claude Debussy. He refused to confess despite being subjected to physical abuse and interrogation on public television. Alex Ross claimed that no composer had ever made a braver stand against totalitarianism. After the end of the Cultural Revolution in 1976, He Luting returned to his position as Director of the Shanghai Conservatory and was allowed to travel overseas, visiting Australia in 1979. In 1984 he retired from his position, retaining the title of honorary director. The main concert hall at the Shanghai Conservatory of Music is named after He.

References

Constructing Nationhood in Modern East Asia

See also
Nie Er
Lü Ji (composer)
Xian Xinghai
Ren Guang

1903 births
1999 deaths
20th-century classical composers
People's Republic of China composers
Republic of China musicians
People's Republic of China politicians from Hunan
Chinese Communist Party politicians from Hunan
Politicians from Shaoyang
Musicians from Hunan
Chinese male classical composers
Chinese classical composers
20th-century Chinese musicians
20th-century male musicians